The Canon PowerShot S200 is a high-end 10.1-megapixel compact digital camera announced and released in 2014 by Canon. The PowerShot S200 is a cheaper version of the Powershot S110, utilizing a 10.1 MP CCD instead of a 12 MP CMOS sensor. It is built as a smaller brother
the S-series of the Canon PowerShot line of cameras.  The S200 does not have RAW image file formatting.

Features
 10.1 megapixels
 JPEG (Exif 2.3) support
 ISO sensitivity 80–6400 (in ⅓-step increments).
 Full manual control.
 Customizable Control Ring to control ISO, shutter speed, aperture, focus, or exposure compensation.
 Video recording : 1280 × 720 (24 frame/s) and 640 × 480 (30 frame/s)
 Video recording Miniature Effect: 1280 × 720 (4.8 / 2.4 / 1.2 frame/s), 640 × 480 (6 / 3 / 1.5 frame/s)
 Continuous shooting: ~1.9 frame/s, 4.5 frame/s (2.5 MP). ~0.8 frame/s with AF.
 Wi-Fi for Internet connectivity or image archival

References
http://www.dpreview.com/products/canon/compacts/canon_s200_2014/specifications
http://www.canon.nl/for_home/product_finder/cameras/digital_camera/powershot/powershot_s200/#p-specification1

S200
Cameras introduced in 2014